False Start is the sixth album by the American rock band Love, released in December 1970.

Background
The second and final Love album for Blue Thumb Records saw bandleader Arthur Lee heavily influenced by his friend, Jimi Hendrix, with Hendrix appearing on the opening track, "The Everlasting First", one of the several tracks that Hendrix recorded with Love at a March 1970 session.

"Stand Out", a song from the band's previous album Out Here, was included here in a live rendition.

Three selections from this LP were added to the Love compilation by Love, entitled Out There.

False Start was issued as part of the May 2007 Hip-O Select release The Blue Thumb Recordings.

Track listing

All tracks written and arranged by Arthur Lee, except "The Everlasting First" arranged by Jimi Hendrix and Arthur Lee.
Side 1
 "The Everlasting First" — 3:01
 "Flying" — 2:37
 "Gimi a Little Break" — 2:10
 "Stand Out" (live) — 3:35
 "Keep On Shining" — 3:50
Side 2
"Anytime" — 3:23
 "Slick Dick" — 3:05
 "Love Is Coming" — 1:24
 "Feel Daddy Feel Good" — 3:15
 "Ride That Vibration" — 3:34

Personnel
 Arthur Lee - lead vocals, rhythm guitar, piano, harmonica
 Gary Rowles - lead guitar
 Frank Fayad - bass
 George Suranovich - drums
 Nooney Rickett - rhythm guitar (2-10), backing vocals (2, 3, 5, 6, 8-10)

Additional personnel
 Jimi Hendrix - lead guitar (track 1)

References

1970 albums
Love (band) albums
Blue Thumb Records albums
Harvest Records albums
Albums produced by Arthur Lee (musician)